The 2011–12 season was West Bromwich Albion's second consecutive season in the Premier League, their sixth in total. During the season, they competed in the League Cup and the FA Cup. Albion finished the season in 10th place after their last league game was a 2–3 loss against Arsenal.

The club introduced the "Baggies Brick Road" outside the East Stand of their home ground, The Hawthorns. Supporters were given the opportunity to purchase personalised bricks to add to the walkway. The first bricks were laid by broadcaster Adrian Chiles and comedian Frank Skinner, both of whom are Albion fans.

Players

First-team squad

Reserves and academy

Out on loan

Results and fixtures

Pre-season
West Brom played no early home pre-season friendlies this season, because of development and leveling of the pitch at The Hawthorns.

Premier League

League Cup

FA Cup

League table

Players statistics

|-
|}

Captains

Top scorers

Last updated on 20 May 2012 (Not fully Checked)

Transfers

In

Out

Notes

References

West Bromwich Albion F.C. seasons
West Bromwich Albion